Hailar may refer to:

 Hailar District, district (former city) in Inner Mongolia, China
 Hailar River, part of the Russia-China border